Lauterborniella is a genus of European non-biting midges in the subfamily Chironominae of the bloodworm family Chironomidae.

Species
As accepted by EOL;
Lauterborniella agrayloides (Kieffer, 1911)
Lauterborniella annulipes (Johannsen 1932)
Lauterborniella cristata (Kieffer 1913)
Lauterborniella fuscoguttata (Kieffer 1922)
Lauterborniella longiventris (Goetghebuer 1936)
Lauterborniella pulchra (Kieffer 1921)
Lauterborniella varipennis (Coquillett, 1902)

References

Chironomidae
Diptera of Europe
Nematocera genera